[[Image:Highroller.jpg|right|thumb|150px|Daniel Wiemer as Highroller in „Highroller and Tank“.]]
Daniel Wiemer (born 4 February 1976 in Cologne, West Germany) is a German actor mainly known for his role of Bong in the German comedy shows Axel! and Axel! will’s wissen with Axel Stein. He also appeared in the German soap opera Verbotene Liebe'' and miscellaneous other productions.

Filmography

External links 

 Highroller und Tank

References 

1976 births
Living people
Actors from Cologne
German male television actors
German male soap opera actors